Juan Manuel Álvarez Hernández (born 1 July 1996) is a Mexican professional footballer who plays as a defender.

Honours
Monterrey
 Copa MX: Apertura 2017

References

External links

1996 births
Living people
Association football midfielders
C.F. Monterrey players
North Texas SC players
Gavilanes de Matamoros footballers
Liga MX players
Liga Premier de México players
Tercera División de México players
Mexican expatriate footballers
Mexican expatriate sportspeople in the United States
Expatriate soccer players in the United States
Footballers from Sinaloa
People from Ahome Municipality
Raya2 Expansión players
Mexican footballers